Zoe Motors, Inc., a subsidiary of Zoe Products Inc., was an early-1980s automotive company based in California and best known for its Zoe Zipper three-wheeled microcar.  Zoe was publicly traded on the NASDAQ as ZOEP and later ZOEP.PK, although the company is no longer active today.  In addition to the Zipper, Zoe's products included the Little Giant truck and the Zoe Runner.

Zoe should be pronounced to rhyme with Maui rather than with doe or joey.

Zoe Zipper 
Zoe Motors' best-known product was its Zoe Zipper vehicle, a very small three-wheeled single-seat car (or "microcar") based on a 50 cc Honda motorcycle engine.  It was manufactured by Mitsuoka Motors of Japan, introduced there in 1982 and made its American debut the following year in 1983, where Zoe had distribution and branding rights to the vehicle.  In the US, the Zipper could be considered a motorcycle for registration and insurance purposes, making it somewhat simpler to own than a full-sized car.  The Zipper was sold in both a convertible and a hardtop model.

The Zipper had angular styling inspired by Giorgetto Giugiaro's "folded paper" automotive designs seen on other early-1980s cars such as the DeLorean and the Lotus Esprit. It ran on regular gasoline.

Perhaps the single best remembered part of the Zipper outside auto-enthusiast circles was its appearance as a prize on the TV game show The Price Is Right.  Neither host Bob Barker nor announcer Johnny Olson could keep from giggling when the incredulous contestant asked "What is that?" and later "It's a car?!"  She did win it, and after enthusiastically hugging and kissing Barker, Barker quipped "If you want some affection, just give a lady a three-wheeled vehicle!"  According to the show, the Zipper (the hardtop model) cost $3785.

The Zipper was not successful in the United States.  Numerous factors contributed to its lack of success. The name and design were perceived as too "cutesy" by the general public.  Also problematic was the one-seat design common to microcars, which severely limited its usefulness as a general-purpose vehicle: even most motorcycles are able to accept a second person as a passenger.  The price, while certainly low for a car, was not so extremely low that consumers were willing to give up the convenience of a second seat.  A four-seat Yugo, for example, boasted a $3990 price in the mid-80s, just slightly more than the Zipper.  Mitsuoka does still manufacture microcars in Japan, currently with four wheels and very different styling.

Little Giant 
Built upon the same 50 cc Honda motorcycle engine as the Zipper but otherwise not resembling it at all, the Zoe Little Giant was a truck, advertised as a "all purpose mini-utility truck" and similar to the baggage carts seen at airports but smaller.  According to Zoe sales literature, it had a payload of half a ton.  With an open doorless cab, it was unsuitable for street driving.  It sold for about $6000 and was released at roughly the same time as the Zipper.

Company information 
At the time of the Zoe Zipper launch, Zoe was headed by president and chairman James MacPherson.  Dan Levitan, formerly of Dollar Rent-a-Car, was executive vice president.  Public relations were handled by the Joseph Molina company, which specialises in the automotive and motorsports with clients such as Rolls-Royce and Lamborghini.

Bibliography 
 Rees, Chris – Three-Wheelers, From Morgan to Messerschmitt, Benz to Bond and Beyond

External links 
Mitsuoka Motors of Japan
Microcar site with a Zoe Zipper picture

Defunct motor vehicle manufacturers of the United States
Microcars
Three-wheeled motor vehicles